Marie-Madeline Blouin, stage name Mademoiselle Dubois (1746–1779), was a French stage actress.

She was engaged at the Comédie-Française in 1759. She became a Sociétaires of the Comédie-Française in 1761. She retired in 1773.

Mademoiselle Dubois often played the prestigious role of tragedienne. However, contemporary critics referred to her as a beautiful stage ornament with moderate talent whose fame was more attributed to her beauty and love affairs.

References

External links 
   Mademoiselle Guéant, Comédie-Française

1746 births
1779 deaths
18th-century French actresses
French stage actresses